The , is a Japanese imperial anthology of waka poetry. It was finished somewhere around 1325 or 1326 CE, two or three years after the Retired Emperor Go-Daigo first ordered it in 1323. It was compiled initially by Fujiwara no Tamefuji, but had to be finished by Fujiwara no Tamesada (both members of the older conservative Nijō). It consists of twenty volumes containing 1,347 poems.

References
pg. 485 of Japanese Court Poetry, Earl Miner, Robert H. Brower. 1961, Stanford University Press, LCCN 61-10925

Japanese poetry anthologies
1320s in Japan
14th-century literature